This page list topics related to the Bailiwick of Guernsey, including Guernsey, Alderney, Sark and smaller islands.



0-9
 .gg
 1987 Island Games
 2003 Island Games
 2007 Alderney UFO sighting
 -hou

A
Air Alderney
Alderney
Alderney Airport
Alderney camps
Alderney Lighthouse
Alderney pound
Alderney Race
Alderney Railway
Alderney Society Museum
Alderney referendum
Archaeology of the Channel Islands
Arsenal Ground (Mount Hale)
Artparks Sculpture Park
Auregnais dialect
Aurigny

B

Bailiff (Channel Islands)
 Bailiff of Guernsey
Bailiwick
 Bailiwick of Guernsey
 Baron de Saumarez
 Batterie Mirus
BBC Radio Guernsey
Bibliography of Guernsey
Blanchelande College
Blue Islands

Bordeaux Harbour
Braye Beach Hotel
Braye du Valle, Guernsey
Braye Harbour
Braye Road railway station
Brecqhou
Bréhon Tower
British Channel Island Ferries
British–Irish Council
Burhou

C

Casquets lighthouses
Castel, Guernsey
Castle Cornet
Catholic Church in Guernsey
Channel Islands
Channel Islands Co-operative Society
Channel Islands Electricity Grid
Channel Islands in the Wars of the Three Kingdoms
Channel Islands Occupation Society
Channel Islands Stock Exchange
Channel Islands Universities Consortium
Channel Islands Witch Trials
Chapel of St Apolline, Guernsey

Chief Minister of Guernsey
Channel Islands Competition and Regulatory Authorities
Civilian life under the German occupation of the Channel Islands
Clameur de haro
Coat of arms of Guernsey
Condor Ferries
Connétable (Jersey and Guernsey)
Courts of Guernsey
COVID-19 pandemic in Guernsey
Crevichon
Crown dependencies
Culture of Guernsey

D
 Daniel de Lisle Brock
 Deportations from the German-occupied Channel Islands
Dexion Absolute
 Doyle Monument
 Duchy of Normandy

E

Ebenezer Le Page
Elections in Alderney
2006 Alderney general election
2008 Alderney general election
2010 Alderney general election
2012 Alderney general election
2014 Alderney general election
2016 Alderney general election
2018 Alderney general election

Elections in Guernsey
2004 Guernsey general election
2008 Guernsey general election
2012 Guernsey general election
2016 Guernsey general election
2020 Guernsey general election
Elizabeth College, Guernsey
Enemy at the Door
 Evacuation of civilians from the Channel Islands in 1940
External relations of Guernsey

F
 FAB Link
Fishing in Guernsey
Flag of Guernsey
Footes Lane
Forest, Guernsey
Fort Clonque
Fort George, Guernsey
Fort Grey
Fort Hommet
Fort Hommet 10.5 cm Coastal Defence Gun Casement Bunker
Fort Saumarez
Fort Tourgis

G

Geology of Guernsey
 George Torode
German fortification of Guernsey
German occupation of the Channel Islands
 GFCTV
Golden Guernsey
Greffier
Guernésiais
Guernsey
Guernsey Airport
Guernsey Ambulance and Rescue Service
Guernsey at the Commonwealth Games
 Guernsey at the 2006 Commonwealth Games
 Guernsey at the 2010 Commonwealth Games
 Guernsey at the 2014 Commonwealth Games
 Guernsey at the 2018 Commonwealth Games
Guernsey Bean Jar
Guernsey Border Agency
Guernsey cattle
Guernsey (clothing)
Guernsey Cricket Board

Guernsey cricket team
 Guernsey Electricity
Guernsey F.C.
Guernsey Festival of Performing Arts
Guernsey Financial Services Commission
Guernsey Football Association
Guernsey Gâche
Guernsey Grammar School and Sixth Form Centre
Guernsey loophole towers
Guernsey Martyrs
Guernsey passport
Guernsey Post
Guernsey pound
Guernsey Press and Star
Guernsey Railway
Guernsey Rangers F.A.C.
Guernsey RFC
Guernsey Rovers A.C.
GY postcode area

H
Hauteville House
HD Ferries
Healthspan
Herm
History of Guernsey
HMS Charybdis (88)
 Houmets
 HUGO (cable system)

I
Icart Point
Inter-insular match
International Island Games Association
Islam in Guernsey
Island FM
Island Games
ISO 3166-2:GG
ITV Channel Television

J
Jackson League
James Saumarez, 1st Baron de Saumarez
Jerbourg Point
Jethou

K

L

La Fregate Hotel (Guernsey)
La Grande Mare
La Mare de Carteret School
La Sablonnerie
Ladies' College
Lager Borkum
Lager Helgoland
Lager Norderney
Lager Sylt
Languages of the Bailiwick of Guernsey
 Law of Guernsey
 Leader of Alderney
Les Casquets
Les Hanois Lighthouse
LGBT rights in Guernsey
 Liberation of the German-occupied Channel Islands
Lieutenant Governor of Guernsey
Lihou
List of artists from Guernsey
List of aviation accidents and incidents in the Channel Islands
List of Bailiffs of Guernsey

List of banks in Guernsey
 List of churches, chapels and meeting halls in the Channel Islands
List of diplomatic missions in Guernsey
List of Governors of Guernsey
List of islands of the Bailiwick of Guernsey
List of laws of Guernsey
List of lighthouses in the Channel Islands
List of newspapers in Guernsey
List of people from Guernsey
List of postage stamps of Alderney
List of postage stamps of Guernsey
List of schools in Guernsey
List of shipwrecks in the Channel Islands
List of supermarket chains in Guernsey
 List of windmills in Guernsey
Little Chapel
Little Roussel
 Little Sark
 Living with the enemy in the German-occupied Channel Islands
Longis

M
Mannez Quarry railway station
 Maritime history of the Channel Islands
Mignot Memorial Hospital
Muratti Vase
Music of the Channel Islands

N
National Trust of Guernsey
Nerine sarniensis
No. 201 Squadron RAF

O
Operation Ambassador
Operation Basalt
Operation Dryad
 Operation Hardtack (commando raid)
Operation Huckaback
 Our Lady of the Rosary Church, Saint Peter Port
Outline of Guernsey

P
Parishes of Guernsey
Peter de Havilland
Pleinmont-Torteval
Policy Council of Guernsey
Politics of Guernsey
Postage stamps and postal history of Guernsey
President of the States of Alderney
Priaulx League
Priaulx Library

Q

R
 Racing galette
Rail transport in Guernsey
Randalls Brewery
Resistance to German occupation of the Channel Islands
 Royal charters applying to the Channel Islands
 Royal Commission on the Constitution (United Kingdom)
Royal Guernsey Light Infantry
Royal Guernsey Militia
 Rugby union in the Bailiwick of Guernsey

S

Saint Andrew, Guernsey
Saint Anne, Alderney
Saint Martin, Guernsey
Saint Peter, Guernsey
Saint Peter Port
Saint Peter Port Harbour
 Saint Peter Port Lifeboat Station
Saint Peter Port North
Saint Peter Port South
Saint Sampson, Guernsey
Saint Saviour, Guernsey
Sandpiper CI
Sark
 Sark during the German occupation of the Channel Islands
Sark football team
Sarnia Cherie
Sausmarez Manor

Scouting in Guernsey
Sercquiais
Siam Cup
Specsavers
Sport in Guernsey
SS Vega (1913)
St James, Guernsey
St Martin’s Parish Church, Guernsey
St Sampson's High School
St. Malo & Binic Steam Ship Company
St. Martins A.C.
States of Alderney
States of Alderney Member
States of Guernsey
States of Guernsey Police Service
Sure (company)
Sylvans S.C.

T
The Blockhouse
The Book of Ebenezer Le Page
The Corbet Field
The Crown
The Guernsey Literary and Potato Peel Pie Society
The International Stock Exchange
The Swinge
The Track
 The Vale Church, Guernsey
Torteval, Guernsey
 Town Church, Guernsey
Transport in Guernsey
 Trident Charter Company

U

V
Val des Terres Hill Climb
Vale, Guernsey
Vale Recreation F.C.
VAT-free imports from the Channel Islands
Vehicle registration plates of the Bailiwick of Guernsey
Vergée
Viaer Marchi
Victor Hugo
Victoria Tower, Guernsey
Visite du Branchage

W
White House (Herm)
William Caparne
Windmills in Guernsey

X

Y

Z

See also
Lists of country-related topics - similar lists for other countries

Guernsey-related lists
Guernsey
Guernsey
Alderney
Sark